Garra stenorhynchus, also known as the Nilgiri garra, is a species of cyprinid fish in the genus Garra from the western Ghats in India.

References 

Garra
Fish described in 1849